Vereya is a Bulgarian association football club based in Stara Zagora, which currently competes in the Southeast Third League, the third tier of Bulgarian football.

Vereya was founded in 2001. The team made a remarkable rise through the levels of the Bulgarian football system, and by 2016, the club reached the top level of Bulgarian football, the First League, for the first time. In 2019, after three seasons in the First League, they were expelled from it for reported match fixing.

History

Foundation and beginning
The club was founded in 2001 by a founding board led by Hristiyan Parvanov, Galin Mihaylov, Slavcho Tanev, Tonko Totev and Dimo Hristov. Until the 2005/06 season it was playing in Regional groups before the promotion to the V AFG under the name FC Vereya-Arsenal after a merger with Arsenal Kazanlak, but after the season 2006/07 Vereya-Arsenal became Arsenal Kazanlak and the 2nd team Vereya Bulsatkom moved to Stara Zagora again and was registered as FC Vereya. They won the A RFG 3 times in the next 5 seasons, getting the promotion during the 2011–12 season.

Trace Group ownership (2012–present)
In 2012, Bulgarian construction company Trace Group started investing in the club and a new stadium project Trace Arena was presented.
On May 21, 2014 the club won the Cup of Bulgarian Amateur Football League after defeating Minyor Pernik 2–0 in the final. During the same season Vereya finished 3rd in the V Group and secured promotion to the higher-ranked professional football league, the B Group.

In 2016, the club submitted an application for the newly restructured Bulgarian First League. On June 1, 2016, one of the new signings of the club for the upcoming season, the Brazilian Elias Alves da Silva, announced that he joined the club, as it would compete in the top league of Bulgaria, long before an official statement was given by the BFU officials on the number of the teams competing in the new league, thus sparking controversy.

On June 7, 2016, Vereya, alongside five other B Group outfits, were approved by the Bulgarian Football Union and were promoted to compete in the upcoming 2016-17 Bulgarian First League. Vereya was one of the clubs with the necessary financial and infrastructural requirements for the new first tier.

In its first ever season in the top level (2016-17), Vereya managed to secure a 7th place finish, thus remaining part of the elite for next season.

In its second season in the top level (2017-18), Vereya surprised many, by finishing in the top 6 in the regular season. 

The third season in the elite was not that successful, however. It was marked by financial problems. On 7 May 2019, Vereya were disqualified from the league for match fixing. All results from played matches involving Vereya were retained with the Bulgarian Football Union awarding Septemvri Sofia two wins by 3–0 from their scheduled relegation play-off matches with Vereya and the loser from the relegation play-off match between Dunav Ruse and Vitosha Bistritsa (the latter) directly faced the second-placed team from the Second League (Montana). Vereya was then disqualified from the Second League, due to financial issues, following which they were also disqualified from the third tier, which meant that the team will start the 2019-20 season from the fourth division of Bulgarian football, in this case the Stara Zagora regional league.

Statistics

Season to season

Seasons in First League: 3
Seasons in B Group (now Second League): 2
Seasons in V Group ( now Third League): 3
Seasons in A Regional Group: 10

Shirt and sponsors
Vereya main colors are blue and white.

Honours
First League:
6th: 2017–18

Second League:
8th 2015–16

Third League: 
  3rd: 2013–14

A RFG Stara Zagora:
  Winners (4): 2005-06, 2008–09, 2010–11, 2011–12
  Runner-up (1): 2009–10

Cup of Bulgarian Amateur Football League:
  Winners (1): 2013–14

Bulgarian Cup:
 Semifinals: 2016–17

Current squad 
As of 1 August 2020

Notable players
Had international caps for their respective countries, or held any club record. Players whose name is listed in bold represented their countries while playing for Vereya or at some other point in their careers.

 Zhivko Zhelev
 Ivan Stoyanov
 Kostadin Stoyanov
 Ivo Ivanov
 Ivan Bandalovski
 Valeri Domovchiyski
 Veselin Minev
 Ventsislav Hristov
 Daniel Naumov
 Petar Vitanov

Europe
 Alexandru Pașcenco
 Andrejs Kovaļovs

Asia
 Hussein Abdulghani

Africa
 Yassine El Kharroubi
 Olivier Bonnes
 Christoffer Mafoumbi
 Ulysse Ndong
 Alexander N'Doumbou
 Samuel Inkoom
 Selim Ben Djemia

Managers

References

External links
Official website
Club page at bgclubs.eu
Club page at Sportal.bg 

Vereya
Vereya